In the 2014–15 season, Rotherham United competed in the Sky Bet Championship. The club also took part in the annual League Cup and FA Cup.

Players

Competitions

Pre-season matches

Championship

League table

Matches

FA Cup

League Cup

The draw for the first round was made on 17 June 2014 at 10am. Rotherham were drawn at home to Fleetwood Town.

Transfers

References

Rotherham United F.C. seasons
Rotherham United F.C.